Thaksin Shinawatra (born 1949) is a former Prime Minister of Thailand.

Thaksin, Thai for "south", may also refer to:
Thaksin Express, an express train which runs to southern Thailand
Thaksin University, a public university in Thailand

See also 
Taksin (1734–1782), king of Siam
Thakins, a Burmese nationalist group